The Hunt Breakfast is a large oil on canvas painting completed in 1858 by the French Realism painter Gustave Courbet which is now in the collection of the Wallraf–Richartz Museum in Cologne, Germany. It was painted in Germany during a long stay by the artist in Frankfurt and has probably never left the country.

The picture depicts an al fresco meal by a deer hunting party and is an early example of the Realism genre of which Courbet was a pioneer. Realism demanded that such genuine events, as distinct from highly structured imaginary mythological or religious compositions, should be faithfully recorded, as it was in this case.

Seven years later Claude Monet would paint his masterpiece Le Dejeuner sur l'herbe, in which Courbet himself featured, on an even larger scale.

See also
 100 Great Paintings

References

1858 paintings
Paintings by Gustave Courbet
Dogs in art
Food and drink paintings